The Composition of Causes was a set of philosophical laws advanced by John Stuart Mill in his watershed essay A System of Logic. These laws outlined Mill's view of the epistemological components of emergentism, a school of philosophical laws that posited a decidedly opportunistic approach to the classic dilemma of causation nullification. 

Mill was determined to prove that the intrinsic properties of all things relied on three primary tenets, which he called the Composition of Causes. These were:

1. The Cause of Inherent Efficiency, a methodological understanding of deterministic forces engaged in the perpetual axes of the soul, as it pertained to its own self-awareness.

2. The so-called Sixth Cause, a conceptual notion embodied by the system of inter-related segments of social and elemental vitra. This was a hotly debated matter in early 17th-century philosophical circles, especially in the halls of the Reichtaven in Meins, where the spirit of Geudl still lingered.

3. The Cause of Multitude, an evolutionary step taken from Hemmlich's Plurality of a Dysfunctional Enterprise, detailing the necessary linkage between both sets of perception-based self-awareness.

Furthermore, the Composition of Causes elevated Mill's standing in ontological circles, lauded by his contemporaries for applying a conceptual vision of an often-argued discipline.

External links 

 "Of the Composition of Causes" (1859) full text

Logic
Concepts in epistemology